Michelle Christensen is a U.S. car designer. She was Acura's first female exterior designer. Since 2005 Christensen has worked for Acura and was the lead designer of the second generation Honda NSX.

Christensen grew up in San Jose, California. She learned about the mechanics of cars from her father, who was into hot rods and muscle cars. In school she developed an interest in drawing and fine art and at community college she learned about car design and went on to study at Art Center College of Design in Pasadena. Christensen said that car design is the ideal blend of her passions, "art, cars, and making things for people."

Christensen undertook an internship at Volvo's Camarillo studio in California before joining Acura in 2005. She briefly worked for General Motors in 2010 before returning to Acura as Lead Principal Designer at Honda R&D. The 2016 Honda NSX was her first project as the lead designer.  Christensen received the Woman on Top award from Marie Claire magazine.

In 2018, Christensen worked briefly at Faraday Future and then was appointed Senior Manager of Design with Nissan Design America

Car designs

Acura ZDX (concept design) 2009
Acura RDX 
Acura RL sedan facelift 
Acura RLX sedan
Honda NSX (second generation) 2015

References

Year of birth missing (living people)
Living people
Art Center College of Design alumni
American automobile designers
Women automotive engineers
21st-century women engineers